The cucumber (Cucumis sativus) is a widely-cultivated creeping vine plant in the family Cucurbitaceae that bears cylindrical to spherical fruits, which are used as culinary vegetables. Considered an annual plant, there are three main types of cucumber—slicing, pickling, and seedless—within which several cultivars have been created. The cucumber originates from Himalaya to China (Yunnan, Guizhou, Guangxi) and N. Thailand, but now grows on most continents, and many different types of cucumber are grown commercially and traded on the global market. In North America, the term wild cucumber refers to plants in the genera Echinocystis and Marah, though the two are not closely related.

Description 
The cucumber is a creeping vine that roots in the ground and grows up trellises or other supporting frames, wrapping around supports with thin, spiraling tendrils. The plant may also root in a soilless medium, whereby it will sprawl along the ground in lieu of a supporting structure. The vine has large leaves that form a canopy over the fruits.

Cucumber fruits consist of 95% water (see nutrition table). In botanical terms, the cucumber is classified as a pepo, a type of botanical berry with a hard outer rind and no internal divisions. However, much like tomatoes and squashes, it is often perceived, prepared, and eaten as a vegetable.

Flowering and pollination 

Most cucumber cultivars are seeded and require pollination. For this purpose, thousands of honey beehives are annually carried to cucumber fields just before bloom. Cucumbers may also be pollinated via bumblebees and several other bee species. Most cucumbers that require pollination are self-incompatible, thus requiring the pollen of another plant in order to form seeds and fruit. Some self-compatible cultivars exist that are related to the 'Lemon' cultivar.

A few cultivars of cucumber are parthenocarpic, the blossoms of which create seedless fruit without pollination, which degrades the eating quality of these cultivar. In the United States, these are usually grown in greenhouses, where bees are excluded. In Europe, they are grown outdoors in some regions, where bees are likewise excluded.

Traditional cultivars produce male blossoms first, then female, in about equivalent numbers. Newer gynoecious hybrid cultivars produce almost all female blossoms. They may have a pollenizer cultivar interplanted, and the number of beehives per unit area is increased, but temperature changes induce male flowers even on these plants, which may be sufficient for pollination to occur.

In 2009, an international team of researchers announced they had sequenced the cucumber genome.

Nutrition, aroma, and taste 

Raw cucumber (with peel) is 95% water, 4% carbohydrates, 1% protein, and contains negligible fat. A  reference serving provides  of food energy. It has a low content of micronutrients: it is notable only for vitamin K, at 16% of the Daily Value (table).

The slightly bitter taste of cucumber rind results from cucurbitacins.

Varieties 

In general cultivation, cucumbers are classified into three main cultivar groups: slicing, pickled, and seedless/burpless.

Slicing 

Cucumbers grown to eat fresh are called slicing cucumbers. The main varieties of slicers mature on vines with large leaves that provide shading.

Slicers grown commercially for the North American market are generally longer, smoother, more uniform in color, and have much tougher skin. In contrast, those in other countries, often called European cucumbers, are smaller and have thinner, more delicate skin, often with fewer seeds, thus are often being sold in plastic skin for protection. This variety may also be called a telegraph cucumber, particularly in Australasia.

Pickling 

Pickling with brine, sugar, vinegar, and spices creates various flavored products from cucumbers and other foods. Although any cucumber can be pickled, commercial pickles are made from cucumbers specially bred for uniformity of length-to-diameter ratio and lack of voids in the flesh. Compared to slicers, picklers tend to be shorter, thicker, less-regularly shaped, and have bumpy skin with tiny white or black-dotted spines. Color can vary from creamy yellow to pale or dark green.

Gherkin 

Gherkins, also called cornichons, or baby pickles, are small cucumbers, typically those  in length, often with bumpy skin, which are typically used for pickling. The word gherkin comes from the early modern Dutch gurken or augurken ('small pickled cucumber'). The term is also used in the name for Cucumis anguria, the West Indian gherkin, a closely related species.

Burpless 

Burpless cucumbers are sweeter and have a thinner skin than other varieties of cucumber. They are reputed to be easy to digest and to have a pleasant taste. Most commonly grown in greenhouses, these parthenocarpic cucumbers are often found in grocery markets, shrink-wrapped in plastic. They are marketed as either burpless or seedless, as the seeds and skin of other varieties of cucumbers are said to give some people gas.

Production

In 2020, world production of cucumbers and gherkins was 91 million tonnes, led by China with 80% of the total.

Cultivation history 

Cultivated for at least 3,000 years, the cucumber originated from India, where a great many varieties have been observed, along with its closest living relative, Cucumis hystrix. It was probably introduced to Europe by the Greeks or Romans. Records of cucumber cultivation appear in France in the 9th century, England in the 14th century, and in North America by the mid-16th century.

Roman Empire 
According to Pliny the Elder, the Emperor Tiberius had the cucumber on his table daily during summer and winter. In order to have it available for his table every day of the year, the Romans reportedly used artificial methods of growing (similar to the greenhouse system), whereby mirrorstone refers to Pliny's lapis specularis, believed to have been sheet mica:

Reportedly, they were also cultivated in specularia, cucumber houses glazed with oiled cloth. Pliny describes the Italian fruit as very small, probably like a gherkin. He also describes the preparation of a medication known as elaterium. However, some scholars believe that he was instead referring to Ecballium elaterium, known in pre-Linnean times as Cucumis silvestris or Cucumis asininus ('wild cucumber' or 'donkey cucumber'), a species different from the common cucumber.  Pliny also writes about several other varieties of cucumber, including the cultivated cucumber, and remedies from the different types (9 from the cultivated; 5 from the "anguine;" and 26 from the "wild").

Middle Ages 
Charlemagne had cucumbers grown in his gardens in the 8th/9th century. They were reportedly introduced into England in the early 14th century, lost, then reintroduced approximately 250 years later. The Spaniards (through the Italian Christopher Columbus) brought cucumbers to Haiti in 1494. In 1535, Jacques Cartier, a French explorer, found "very great cucumbers" grown on the site of what is now Montreal.

Early-modern age 

Throughout the 16th century, European trappers, traders, bison hunters, and explorers bartered for the products of American Indian agriculture. The tribes of the Great Plains and the Rocky Mountains learned from the Spanish how to grow European crops.  The farmers on the Great Plains included the Mandan and Abenaki. They obtained cucumbers and watermelons from the Spanish, and added them to the crops they were already growing, including several varieties of corn and beans, pumpkins, squash, and gourd plants. The Iroquois were also growing them when the first Europeans visited them.

In 1630, the Reverend Francis Higginson produced a book called New-Englands Plantation in which, describing a garden on Conant's Island in Boston Harbor known as The Governor's Garden, he states:The countrie aboundeth naturally with store of roots of great  and good to eat. Our turnips, parsnips, and carrots are here both bigger and sweeter than is ordinary to be found in England. Here are store of pompions, cowcumbers, and other things of that nature which I know not…In New England Prospect (1633, England), William Wood published observations he made in 1629 in America:

Age of Enlightenment and later

In the later 17th century, a prejudice developed against uncooked vegetables and fruits. A number of articles in contemporary health publications stated that uncooked plants brought on summer diseases and should be forbidden to children. The cucumber kept this reputation for an inordinate period of time, "fit only for consumption by cows," which some believe is why it gained the name, cowcumber.

Samuel Pepys wrote in his diary on 22 August 1663:[T]his day Sir W. Batten tells me that Mr. Newburne is dead of eating cowcumbers, of which the other day I heard of another, I think.

A copper etching made by Maddalena Bouchard between 1772 and 1793 shows this plant to have smaller, almost bean-shaped fruits, and small yellow flowers. The small form of the cucumber is figured in Herbals of the 16th century, however stating that "[i]f hung in a tube while in blossom, the Cucumber will grow to a most surprising length."

Gallery

See also 

 Armenian cucumber, a variety of muskmelon that resembles a cucumber 
 Cucumber blessing
 Cucumber cake
 Cucumber juice
 Cucumber raita
 Cucumber sandwich
 Cucumber soda
 Cucumber soup
 Sea cucumber, named for its resemblance to the fruit

References 

 
Fruit vegetables
Plants described in 1753